The Okolona Municipal Separate School District is a public school district based in Okolona, Mississippi (USA).

In addition to Okolona, the district serves rural areas in eastern Chickasaw County and extends into a small portion of neighboring Monroe County.

Schools
Okolona High School (Grades 5–12)
Okolona Elementary School (Grades K-4)

Demographics

2006–07 school year
There were a total of 777 students enrolled in the Okolona Municipal Separate School District during the 2006–2007 school year. The gender makeup of the district was 52% female and 48% male. The racial makeup of the district was 96.01% African American, 3.86% White, and 0.13% Asian. 82.9% of the district's students were eligible to receive free lunch.

Previous school years

Accountability statistics

See also
List of school districts in Mississippi

References

External links
Okolona Municipal Separate School District

Education in Chickasaw County, Mississippi
Education in Monroe County, Mississippi
School districts in Mississippi